There are 14 known cemeteries on St. Eustatius a special municipality (officially "public body") of the Netherlands, some of which are still in use.

List of cemeteries
 Old Church Cemetery
 Jewish Cemetery
 Anglican Cemetery
 Roman Catholic Cemetery
 Salem Cemetery
 Congo Cemetery
 Benners Family Graveyard
 Berkel Family Graveyard
 de Groebe Family Graveyard
 Cemetery at Schotsenhoek
 Plantation Graveyard at English Quarter
 Plantation Graveyard at Concordia
 Old Dutch Reformed Cemetery
 Lazareto Leper Colony

Unmarked cemeteries
Furthermore, St. Eustatius has several eighteenth-century burial sites of free and enslaved Africans that have been (partially) excavated by archaeologists, such as the slave cemetery of the Godet plantation on the west coast of the island, next to Fort Amsterdam. And the plantation Golden Rock nearby F.D. Roosevelt Airport. In 2021, at least 48 graves of enslaved people were found at the Golden Rock site.

History
The Old Church Cemetery is considered the oldest cemetery in St. Eustatius. The oldest dated headstone in this cemetery is of Lucas Jacobsen, who died on Sept. 17, 1686. Jacobsen was a governor on St. Eustatius from 1671 to 1672. Also buried in Salem Cemetery are three victims of the World War II who were born on St. Eustatius: John Otavo Dembrooke, James Clarence van Putten en William Oraldo Hooker On May 4, during the Remembrance of the Dead, they are remembered with a ceremony at the cemetery.

External links
 Masters thesis of Laurie J. Paonessa, The Cemeteries of St Eustatius, N.A: Status in a Caribbean Community https://core.ac.uk/download/pdf/235408262.pdf

References

 
Islands of the Netherlands Antilles